William Theodore Peters (1862 – 1904 in Paris)  was an American poet and actor. Associated with 1890s decadence, he was a friend of Ernest Dowson, who dedicated a poem to him, "To William Theodore Peters on His Renaissance Cloak". In October 1892, he commissioned Dowson to write the play that would ultimately become the Pierrot of the Minute, for him to act in. Peters also authored an epilogue to the play, spoken by the character of Pierrot. This was included in Peters' book of verse, Posies Out of Rings and Other Conceits, a "quaint little salmon pink volume", which was published by John Lane and the Bodley Head in 1896. Peters also wrote a children's book, 'The Children of the Week', illustrated by Clinton Peters, published in 1886 by Dodd, Mead, & Co. Peters' only other book was 1894's the Tournament of Love, published by Brentano's, with drawings by Alfred Garth Jones. Later, music was composed for the piece by Noel Johnson. The work was performed at the Théâtre d'Application, 18 rue St. Lazare, on May 8, 1894, with Peters playing the part of the troubadour Betrand de Roaix. He was a frequent guest of the Rhymers' Club. Peters died of starvation in Paris. Peters died in poverty at the age of 41 or 42 in Paris.

Bibliography
The Children of the Week, being the honest and only authentic account of certain stories, as related by the Red Indian, to Alexander Selkirk, Jr. (1886)
The Tournament of Love (1894)
Posies Out of Rings, and Other Conceits (1896)

Notes

1862 births
1904 deaths
19th-century American male actors
19th-century American poets
American male poets
American male stage actors
American expatriates in France